Scrobipalpa mongoloides is a moth in the family Gelechiidae. It was described by Povolný in 1969. It is found in Kazakhstan, Kyrgyzstan, northern Pakistan, Uzbekistan, China (Gansu, Hebei, Henan, Inner Mongolia, Ningxia, Qinghai, Xinjiang) and Mongolia.

References

Scrobipalpa
Moths described in 1969
Taxa named by Dalibor Povolný